Aminagad  is a village in the southern state of Karnataka, India. It is located in the Hungund taluk of Bagalkot district in Karnataka. Amingad is famous for its “Karadantu” (A nice tasty sweet).  Karadantu is prepared using edible gum, dry fruits, sugar or jaggery.
Amingad is also famous in cattle, Sheep, Lamb selling bazar in the state, bazar is on every Saturday, even sheep business from distant Tumukur and other parts of the state.

Demographics
 India census, Aminagad had a population of 13593 with 6837 males and 6756 females.

Temples in Amingad
Banashankari Devi Temple
Sanagmeshwara Temple
Hanuman Temple on the Rock Mountain (Hill Top).
Haadi Basavangudi and Veerabhadreshwar temple (near banashankari temple)
Mangalammana Gudi 
Kalammana Gudi.

General Information
Amingad PIN Code is 587112.
Amingad  Telephone Code / Std Code:08351

See also
 Bagalkot
 Districts of Karnataka
 Aihole

References

External links
http://Bagalkot.nic.in/
http://badamionline.com/index.php/other-places/amingad/

Villages in Bagalkot district